The Garland of Howth, also known as the Codex Usserianus Secundus, designated by r2 or 28 (in the Beuron system), is a fragmentary 8th to 10th century Latin Gospel Book now in Trinity College Dublin as MS. 56 (A. IV. 6).

The text, written on vellum, is a version of the old Latin. The manuscript contains the text of the four Gospels with lacunae. It was written at the monastery of Ireland's Eye, Dublin, and once kept in the nearby parish church of Howth. Only 86 folios have survived; for example only 5:12-10:3 of the Gospel of John have survived. It is written with "diminuendo" script from initials, a feature of the oldest manuscripts in insular script such as Cathach of St. Columba. It has been described as the work of many scribes, none of them first-class.

The text of the codex is mixed. The text of Matthew is Old Latin, similar to that in Codex Usserianus I. The text of Mark, Luke, and John is very near to the Vulgate.

"Vetus Latina" means the text is a Latin version predating the Vulgate - such versions were used in Ireland later than in most areas.  The "garland" of its title is taken from a corrupted English form of Ceithre Leabhair, Gaelic for 'four books', i.e., a gospel. Abbott made a collation. The manuscript was examined and edited by Lawlor, Hoskier, and Jülicher.

See also

 List of New Testament Latin manuscripts
 Codex Usserianus I
 Book of Dimma
 Book of Mulling
 Würzburg Universitätsbibliothek Cod. M. p. th. f. 67

References

 Literature in Ireland, by James Carney, in A New History of Ireland, vol. 2, p. 527, 531.

Further reading
 T. K. Abbott, Evangeliorum Versio antehieronymiana ex codice Usseriano, vol. II (Dublin, 1884), pp. 819–963. 
 A. Jülicher, Itala. Das Neue Testament in Altlateinischer Überlieferung, Walter de Gruyter, Berlin, New York, 1976.

External links
 Direct link to the digitised manuscript, Library of Trinity College Dublin Digital Collections
 Howth history
 The City and the Book - much detail on textual contents of Irish MS in particular
 The text of Codex Usserianus 2., r2 (microform) ("Garland of Howth") with critical notes to supplement and correct the collation of the late T. K. Abbott (1919)
 Early Irish Manuscripts Project, Library of Trinity College Dublin
More information at Earlier Latin Manuscripts

8th-century biblical manuscripts
9th-century biblical manuscripts
10th-century biblical manuscripts
Gospel Books
Hiberno-Saxon manuscripts
Irish manuscripts
Vetus Latina New Testament manuscripts
Library of Trinity College Dublin
Howth